Dolichoderus pilosus is a species of ant in the genus Dolichoderus. Described by Zhou and Zheng in 1997, the species is endemic to China.

References

Dolichoderus
Hymenoptera of Asia
Insects of China
Insects described in 1997